Sioned is a Welsh feminine given name. It may refer to:

Sioned Harries (born 1989), Welsh rugby union player
Sioned James (1974–2016), Welsh musician and choir conductor
Sioned Wiliam (born 1962), Welsh comedy producer and executive

In fiction
Sioned [see: Characters of Dragon Prince], the Sunrunner "witch", a main character from Melanie Raun’s novels

See also
Sione, an unrelated Oceanic-origin name with a similar spelling